The ivory-billed coucal or greater black coucal (Centropus menbeki) is a species of cuckoo in the family Cuculidae. It is found in the Aru Islands and New Guinea. Its natural habitat is subtropical or tropical moist lowland forest.

References

ivory-billed coucal
Birds of the Aru Islands
Birds of New Guinea
ivory-billed coucal
ivory-billed coucal
Taxonomy articles created by Polbot